New York Convention may refer to one of two treaties signed in New York City:
Convention for the Suppression of the Traffic in Persons and of the Exploitation of the Prostitution of Others of 1950
Convention on the Recognition and Enforcement of Foreign Arbitral Awards of 1958